Hunt Terrier (not "hunting terrier") refers to types of terrier dogs that were attached to British "hunts", horse-oriented social clubs devoted to chasing the red fox on horseback, following packs of hounds. The hunt terrier was kept for a variety of reasons, such as rat control around stables and kennels, and to run with the hounds to flush the fox from small hiding places. It might also be expected to flush foxes from underground dens ("going to earth" like a working terrier), or to act as a lurcher. They tended to be white in colour so as to be more easily seen by the hunter, but they could be any colour.

Where hunts and fox hunting remain legal today, such as in the United States, terriers are little used. Breeds refined from Hunt terriers, such as the Fox Terrier and Jack Russell Terrier, are kept today as pets and showdogs, or, if small enough, as working terriers.

Some breeds derived from hunt terriers 
Border Terrier
Chilean Terrier
Hunt Terrier (American)
Jack Russell Terrier 
Japanese Terrier
Miniature Fox Terrier
Parson Russell Terrier
Plummer Terrier
Rat Terrier
Ratonero Bodeguero Andaluz
Russell Terrier
Smooth Fox Terrier
Tenterfield Terrier
Terrier Brasileiro
Toy Fox Terrier
Wire Fox Terrier

References

See also 
Working terrier
Fox hunting
Fell Terrier

Dog types
Hunting dogs
Terriers